The Trowbridge Archaeological Site is located in the vicinity of North 61st Street and Leavenworth Road in Kansas City, Kansas.  Discovered in 1939 by amateur archaeologist Harry Trowbridge in the back yard of his property, it was inhabited c. AD 200–600 by the Kansas City Hopewell culture.

It was listed on the National Register of Historic Places on February 24, 1971, and placed on the Register of Historic Kansas Places on July 1, 1977.

See also
 Hopewell tradition
 List of Hopewell sites
Mound builder (people)
Earthwork (archaeology)

References

Kansas City Hopewell
Archaeological sites on the National Register of Historic Places in Kansas
History of Kansas City, Kansas
Geography of Wyandotte County, Kansas
National Register of Historic Places in Kansas City, Kansas
Former Native American populated places in the United States
Native American history of Kansas